{{Infobox pharaoh
| name = Djoser
| image = Djoser statue.jpg
| caption = Limestone Ka statue of Djoser from his pyramid serdab
| reign = 19 or 28 years ca.  ca. 2686–2648 BC,  2687–2668 BC,  2668–2649 BC,  2667–2648 BC, or  2630–2611 BC
| predecessor = Khasekhemwy (most likely) or Nebka
| successor = Sekhemkhet (most likely) or Sanakhte
| alt_name = Netjerikhet, Tosorthros, Sesorthos
| prenomen = Nisut-Bity-Nebty-Netjerikhetnebu  nsw.t-bty-nb.ty nṯrj-ẖt-nbw  King of Upper and Lower Egypt,  he of the two ladies,  with a divine body of gold  M23:t-L2:t-G16-R8-D21:F32:S12
| prenomen_hiero =
| nomen = Nub-Hor  Nbw-Ḥr  Golden Horus  G8
| nomen_hiero =
| horus = Hor-Netjerikhet  Hr-nṯrj.ẖt  Horus, divine of body| horus_hiero = R8-D21:F32
| nebty = Netjerikhet  Nb.tj Nṯrj-ẖt  The two Ladies, divine of body   nTr r:X 
| nebty_hiero =
| golden = Nub-Ra  Nbw-Rˁ  Golden one of Ra  N5:S12  Abydos King List  ....djeser-sa ...-ḏsr-s3  ...sublime protector  HASH-D45-V17  Saqqara Tablet  Djoser  ḏsr  The sublime  D45:D21  Turin King List  Djoserit  Ḏsr-jt  D45:r-M17-X1-G7-G7 
| golden_hiero =
| death_date = c. 2649 BC or c. 2611 BC
| spouse = Hetephernebti
| children = Inetkawes, maybe Sekhemkhet ?
| dynasty = 3rd Dynasty
| father = Khasekhemwy
| mother = Nimaethap
| burial = Step pyramid at Saqqara
| monuments =
}}

Djoser (also read as Djeser and Zoser) was an ancient Egyptian pharaoh of the 3rd Dynasty during the Old Kingdom, and was the founder of that epoch. He is also known by his Hellenized names Tosorthros (from Manetho) and Sesorthos (from Eusebius). He was the son of King Khasekhemwy and Queen Nimaathap, but whether he was also the direct successor to their throne is unclear. Most Ramesside king lists identify a king named Nebka as preceding him, but there are difficulties in connecting that name with contemporary Horus names, so some Egyptologists question the received throne sequence. Djoser is known for his step pyramid, which is the earliest colossal stone building in ancient Egypt.

 Identity 
 The painted limestone statue of Djoser, now in the Egyptian Museum in Cairo, is the oldest known life-sized Egyptian statue. Today, at the site in Saqqara where it was found, a plaster copy of it stands in place of the original. The statue was discovered during the Antiquities Service Excavations of 1924–1925.

In contemporary inscriptions, he is called Netjerikhet, meaning "divine of body." Later sources, which include a New Kingdom reference to his construction, help confirm that Netjerikhet and Djoser are the same person.

While Manetho names Necherophes and the Turin King List names Nebka as the first ruler of the Third Dynasty, many Egyptologists now believe Djoser was first king of this dynasty, pointing out that the order in which some predecessors of Khufu are mentioned in the Westcar Papyrus suggests Nebka should be placed between Djoser and Huni, not before Djoser. More significantly, the English Egyptologist Toby Wilkinson has demonstrated that burial seals found at the entrance to Khasekhemwy's tomb in Abydos name only Djoser, rather than Nebka. This supports the view that it was Djoser who buried and, hence, directly succeeded Khasekhemwy, rather than Nebka.

Family

Djoser is linked to Khasekhemwy, the last king of the Second Dynasty of Egypt, through his wife Queen Nimaethap (Nimaat-hap) via seals found in Khasekhemwy's tomb and at Beit Khallaf. The seal at Abydos names Nimaat-hap as the "mother of the king's children, Nimaat-hap". On mastaba K1 at Beit Khallaf, the same person is mentioned as the "mother of the dual king". Dating of other seals at the Beit Khallaf site place them to the reign of Djoser. This evidence suggests that Khasekhemwy is either the direct father of Djoser or that Nimaat-hap had him through a previous husband. German Egyptologist Gunter Dreyer found Djoser's sealings at Khasekhemwy's tomb, further suggesting that Djoser was the direct successor of Khasekhemwy and that he finished the construction of the tomb.

Her cult seems to have still been active in the later reign of Sneferu.

Hetephernebti is identified as one of Djoser's queens "on a series of boundary stela from the Step Pyramid enclosure (now in various museums) and a fragment of relief from a building at Hermopolis" currently in the Egyptian museum of Turin.

Inetkawes was their only daughter known by name. There was also a third royal female attested during Djoser's reign, but her name is destroyed. The relationship between Djoser and his successor, Sekhemkhet, is not known, and the date of his death is uncertain.

Reign

 Third Dynasty 
The lands of Upper and Lower Egypt were united into a single kingdom sometime around 2686 BC. The period following the unification of the crowns was one of prosperity, marked by the start of the Third Dynasty and the Old Kingdom of Egypt. The exact identity of the founder of the dynasty is a matter of debate, due to the fragmentary nature of the records from the period. Djoser is one of the principal candidates for the founder of the Third Dynasty. Other candidates are Nebka and Sanakht. Complicating matters further is the possibility that Nebka and Sanakht are referring to the same person.

Egyptologist Toby Wilkinson believes that the weight of archeological evidence favours Djoser (Netjerikhet) as Khasekhemwy's successor and therefore founder of the Third Dynasty. A seal from Khasekhemwy's tomb at Abydos, in combination with a seal from mastaba K1 at Beit Khallaf dated to Djoser's reign, links the two pharaohs together as father and son respectively. The seal at Abydos names a 'Nimaat-hap' as the mother of Khasekhemwy's children, while the other seal at Beit Khallaf names the same person as the 'mother of the dual-king'. Further archaeological evidence linking the reigns of the two pharaohs together are found at Shunet et-Zebib, which suggest that Djoser oversaw the burial of his predecessor. Ritual stone vessels found at the sites of the tombs – Khasekhemwy's tomb at Abydos and Djoser's tomb at Saqqara – of the two pharaohs also appear to have come from the same collection, as samples from both sites contain identical imagery of the god Min. This archeological evidence is supplemented by at least one historical source, the Saqqara king list, which names Djoser as the immediate successor of Beby – a misreading of Khasekhemwy.

 Length of reign 
Manetho states Djoser ruled Egypt for twenty-nine years, while the Turin King List states it was only nineteen years. Because of his many substantial building projects, particularly at Saqqara, some scholars argue Djoser must have enjoyed a reign of nearly three decades. Manetho's figure appears to be more accurate, according to Wilkinson's analysis and reconstruction of the Royal Annals. Wilkinson reconstructs the Annals as giving Djoser "28 complete or partial years", noting that the cattle counts recorded on Palermo stone register V, and Cairo Fragment 1, register V, for the beginning and ending of Djoser's reign, would most likely indicate his regnal years 1–5 and 19–28. Unfortunately, next to all entries are illegible today. The Year of coronation is preserved, followed by the year events receiving the twin-pillars and stretching the cords for the fortress Qau-Netjerw ("hills of the gods").

 Period of reign 
Various sources provide various dates for Djoser's reign. Professor of Ancient Near East history  Marc van de Mieroop dates Djoser's reign to somewhere between 2686 BC to 2648 BC. Authors Joann Fletcher and Michael Rice date his reign from 2667 BC to 2648 BC giving a regnal period of 18 partial or complete years. Rice further states that Nebkha was Djoser's brother and predecessor. Writer Farid Atiya provides a similar regnal period to Fletcher and Rice, offset by a single year – 2668 BC to 2649 BC. This dating is supported by authors Rosalie and Charles Baker in Ancient Egypt: People of the Pyramids. Egyptologist Abeer el-Shahawy in association with the Egyptian Museum in Cairo places Djoser's reign to the period of 2687 BC to 2668 BC for a similar 18 partial or complete years. Author Margaret Bunson places Djoser as the second ruler of the Third Dynasty, and places his reign to the period of 2630 BC to 2611 BC for 19 partial or complete year reign. In her chronology, Djoser is preceded by Nebka as the "Founder of the Third Dynasty", reigning for the period 2649 BC to 2630 BC. She, like Rice, makes Nebka a brother of Djoser.

 Military expeditions 

Djoser dispatched several military expeditions to the Sinai Peninsula, during which the local inhabitants were subdued. He also sent expeditions there to mine for valuable minerals such as turquoise and copper. This is known from inscriptions found in the desert there, sometimes displaying the banner of Set alongside the symbols of Horus, as had been more common under Khasekhemwy. The Sinai was also strategically important as a buffer between the Nile valley and Asia.
Construction projects
His most famous monument was his step pyramid, which entailed the construction of several mastaba tombs one over another. These forms would eventually lead to the standard pyramid tomb in the later Old Kingdom. Manetho, many centuries later, alludes to architectural advances of this reign, mentioning that "Tosorthros" discovered how to build with hewn stone, in addition to being remembered as the physician Aesculapius, and for introducing some reforms in the writing system. Modern scholars think that Manetho originally ascribed (or meant to ascribe) these feats to Imuthes, who was later deified as Aesculapius by the Greeks and Romans, and who corresponds to Imhotep, the famous minister of Djoser who engineered the Step Pyramid's construction.

Some fragmentary reliefs found at Heliopolis and Gebelein mention Djoser's name, and suggest he commissioned construction projects in those cities. Also, he may have fixed the southern boundary of his kingdom at the First Cataract. An inscription known as the Famine Stela and claiming to date to the reign of Djoser, but probably created during the Ptolemaic Dynasty, relates how Djoser rebuilt the temple of Khnum on the island of Elephantine at the First Cataract, thus ending a seven-year famine in Egypt. Some consider this ancient inscription as a legend at the time it was inscribed. Nonetheless, it does show that more than two millennia after his reign, Egyptians still remembered Djoser.

Although he seems to have started an unfinished tomb at Abydos (Upper Egypt), Djoser was eventually buried in his famous pyramid at Saqqara in Lower Egypt. Since Khasekhemwy, a pharaoh from the 2nd dynasty, was the last pharaoh to be buried at Abydos, some Egyptologists infer that the shift to a more northerly capital was completed during Djoser's time.

 Djoser and Imhotep 
One of the most famous contemporaries of king Djoser was his vizier (tjaty), "head of the royal shipyard" and "overseer of all stone works", Imhotep. Imhotep oversaw stone building projects such as the tombs of King Djoser and King Sekhemkhet. It is possible that Imhotep was mentioned in the also famous Papyrus Westcar, in a story called "Khufu and the magicians". But because the papyrus is badly damaged at the beginning, Imhotep's name is lost today. A papyrus from the ancient Egyptian temple of Tebtunis, dating to the 2nd century AD, preserves a long story in the demotic script about Djoser and Imhotep. In Djoser's time, Imhotep was of such importance and fame that he was honoured by being mentioned on statues of king Djoser in his necropolis at Saqqara.

 Tomb 

Djoser was buried in his famous step pyramid at Saqqara. This pyramid was originally built as a nearly square mastaba, but then five further mastabas were literally piled one upon another, each smaller than the previous one, until the monument became Egypt's first step pyramid. Supervisor of the building constructions was the high lector priest Imhotep.

 The pyramid 

The step pyramid is made of limestone. It is massive and contains only one tight corridor leading to the close midst of the monument, ending in a rough chamber where the entrance to the tomb shaft was hidden. This inner construction was later filled with rubble, for it was of no use anymore. The pyramid was once 62 metres high and had a base measurement of ca. 125 X 109 metres. It was tightly covered in finely polished, white limestone.

 Subterranean structure 

Under the step pyramid, a large maze of long corridors and chambers was dug. The burial chamber lies in the midst of the subterranean complex; a 28 meter deep shaft that leads directly from the surface down to the burial chamber. The shaft entrance was sealed by a plug stone with a weight of 3.5 tons. The subterranean burial maze contains four magazine galleries, each pointing straight to one cardinal direction. The eastern gallery contained three limestone reliefs depicting king Djoser during the celebration of the Heb-Sed (rejuvenation feast). The walls around and between these reliefs were decorated with bluish faience tiles. They were thought to imitate reed mats, as an allusion to the mythological underworld waters. The other galleries remained unfinished.

At the eastern side of the pyramid, very close to the blue chambers, eleven tomb shafts lead straight down for 30 – 32 metres, and then deviate in a right angle to the west. Shafts I – V were used for the burials of royal family members; shafts VI – XI were used as symbolic tombs for the grave goods of royal ancestors from dynasties I – II. More than 40,000 vessels, bowls and vases made of various kinds of stone were found in these galleries. Royal names such as of kings Den, Semerkhet, Nynetjer and Sekhemib were incised on the pots. It is now thought that Djoser once restored the original tombs of the ancestors, and then sealed the grave goods in the galleries in an attempt to save them.

 Serdab Statue of Djoser 
The statue of Djoser is walled into the serdab. The main purpose of the statue was to allow the king to manifest himself and be able to see the rituals performed in and out the serdab. This painted statue is plastered and made out of limestone. Each characteristic of the statue represents something, the striated tripartite wig he is wearing assimilates him to the living world as a dead king. The striped head cloth that covers the wig was used to cover all of his hair. This was a ritual that began to be used by kings in the fourth dynasty. The body is wrapped under a long robe, his hands are placed in a specific way. His right arm is horizontally displayed on his chest while his left arm is resting on his thigh. The placement of his arms are a resemblance to Khasekhem seat. One of the oldest representations of the Nine bows, and the first representation of the nine bows fully developed, is on the seated statue of Pharaoh Djoser. His feet rest upon part of the nine bows, which may have referred to Nubians during his reign because of their use of bows and arrows.

 Funerary complex 

The funerary complex is the first architectural project to be built entirely out of stone. This complex had fourteen entrances but only one was functional. It is made up of the Great South Court, and the Heb-sed north court with Djoser's step pyramid in the center. The complex is enclosed by a 10.5 meters high stone wall, referred to as the enclosure wall. Along with the main courts there is a Roofed Colonnade Entrance located within the south court and a Serdab chamber that holds the seated statue of the king Djoser.

See also
 List of pharaohs

 Notes 

 References 

 Bibliography 

Further reading
 Rosanna Pirelli, "Statue of Djoser" in Francesco Tiradritti (editor): The Treasures of the Egyptian Museum. American University in Cairo Press, Cairo 1999, p. 47.
 Iorwerth Eiddon Stephen Edwards: The Pyramids of Egypt''. West Drayton 1947; Rev. ed. Harmondsworth 1961; Rev. ed. Harmondsworth 1985 (deutsche Ausgabe: Die ägyptischen Pyramiden, 1967)

External links 

A Detailed profile of Djoser

 
27th-century BC Pharaohs
Pharaohs of the Third Dynasty of Egypt